Emerald Park is an unincorporated community in Saskatchewan, Canada within the Rural Municipality (RM) of Edenwold No. 158.

The RM of Edenwold No. 158 was home to 4,490 residents in 2016 with an estimated 1,700 of those residents calling Emerald Park home.

Over 130 businesses operate from Emerald Park, Great Plains Industrial Park and the Butte Business District.

History 
Emerald Park was developed in the mid eighties.  Initially, an auction house, agriculture implement dealerships and a gas station were the first structures in the area.

Not long afterward a developer had a vision for a community of larger-lot homes built around a golf course.

Now, Emerald Park is home to several homes, industrial, retail and commercial businesses and is a full-service community.

The RM of Edenwold office is located at 100 Hutchence Road in Emerald Park.

Demographics 

Education 
There are three schools serving Emerald Park families:
École White City School – a French immersion school, kindergarten through grade 8;
Emerald Ridge Elementary School – kindergarten through grade 8; and
Greenall High School (Balgonie) – grades 9 through 12.

Businesses 
There are over 130 businesses located in and around Emerald Park, employing approximately 1,800 people.

Grocery stores, hardware stores, pharmacies, clothing and retail stores and restaurants serve residents and industrial companies and specialty farm equipment retailers and manufacturers lead the way in innovation and forward-thinking.

Recreation and services

Recreation 
In Emerald Park, residents have access to tennis courts, pickleball courts, soccer fields (and the new soccer centre facility on Great Plains Road), several pathways, trails and playground equipment, in addition to a privately run indoor skating rink (Communiskate).

The White Butte Trails (located north of Highway 1) are a unique natural asset to enjoy free hiking and cross-country skiing opportunities. Portions of the Trans Canada Trail run throughout the RM of Edenwold No. 158.

The Southeast Regional Library has three library branches in the area offering weekly programming options – including story times for parents and children.

Neighbouring communities have curling rinks, senior centres, an outdoor swimming pool, golf courses, baseball diamond, splash parks, skate parks, rodeo arenas, and community halls.

Annual recreation grants are given to towns and the village within the RM of Edenwold No. 158.

A variety of churches operate in the area, including:
Balgonie Baptist Church, Balgonie United Church, and St. Joseph's Catholic Church in the Town of Balgonie;.
Ambassadors for Christ Church in the Town of White City;
Way of Life Church and St. Agnes Roman Catholic Church in the Town of Pilot Butte; and
St. Paul's Lutheran Church in the Village of Edenwold.

Services 
Water and sewer service is provided by the RM of Edenwold No. 158. Garbage and recycling pick up is coordinated for Emerald Park residents through private contractors. Fire protection agreements are in place between the RM of Edenwold No. 158 and the towns of Balgonie, White City, and Pilot Butte, the Village of Edenwold, and the Hamlet of Kronau. A secondary service provider agreement is in place with the City of Regina.

Media 
In addition to local municipal newsletters, the Quad Town Forum is a weekly newspaper that serves the RM, White City, Pilot Butte, Balgonie, and the surrounding areas.

References 

Edenwold No. 158, Saskatchewan
Unincorporated communities in Saskatchewan
Division No. 6, Saskatchewan